The Pokomo people are a Bantu ethnic group of southeastern Kenya. The population in Kenya was 112,075 in 2019. They are a distinct ethnic group with their own sub-clans/tribes. Despite their proximity, they are not of the nearby Mijikenda people. They are predominantly agriculturalists and both freshwater and ocean fishermen living along the Tana River in Tana River County. They speak the Pokomo language, which is similar to Swahili.

The Pokomo population is split into two groups: the Upper Pokomo, who make up 75% of the population, and the Lower Pokomo. The Upper Pokomo are mainly Muslim, and have been so since the first half of the 20th century. The Lower Pokomos, who live along the lower part of the Tana up to the delta, became Christians beginning in the late 1870s, and, by 1914, had almost exclusively converted. Ethnologue indicates that the group is mainly Muslim.

Subgroups

In "History of Linguistics: Case Study of Tana River", Dereke Nurse confirmed that the Pokomo regard themselves and their language as divisible into Lower (LP) and Upper Pokomo (UP). The people and the language of roughly the northern one-third of the River Tana towards Garisa are known as Malakote (also known as Ilwana or El-Wana). Malakote differ considerably from UP and LP. Even the two-way split UP: LP is partly artificial linguistically. The major break does occur around Mwina, but these are also internal isoglosses dividing UP and LP. Some of these link adjoining part of UP and LP.

Within Pokomo, considerable linguistic variation occurs at all levels: lexical, phonological and morphological. Despite the small size of the Pokomo Community, at least as much internal difference separates UP and LP as do the two poles of the 150 mile-long Malakote Community. Van Otterloo assess the level of lexical similarity between UP and LP as much the same as that between Giriama and Digo. UP and LP refer to each other jocularly as "two-week" languages; that is, they take two weeks to learn, but Malakote, within UP is regarded as a "two-months language". This demonstrates that Pokomo are not part of the Mijikenda community, which is composed of nine sub-tribes, the Kauma, Chonyi, Jibana, Giriama, Kambe, Ribe, Rabai, Duruma and Digo.

The Pokomo are subdivided into eleven (11) sub-tribes: six in the UP (Mila Julu) and five in the LP (Mila Nchini). The word Mila connotes "culture"; julu, nchini and kote mean "up", "lower" and "both" respectively; therefore the word milajulu refers to the culture of the Upper Pokomo and milanchini to the culture of the Lower Pokomo. Thus, Milakote (evolving into Malakote) connotes culture from both sides (here referring to blended culture of Pokomo and Orma/Somalis/Borana).

Upper Pokomo (Wantu wa Julu: "Milajulu")
All UP clans live along the river and in the hinterland from the river on both sides in villages located on small hills, probably to avoid river flooding. The farmlands are within the riverline on both sides of the river stretching an average of 3 miles or until the farms touches the sandy soils.

 Milalulu (are located along the riverine from the Rhoka village in the north to Bohoni village)
 Zubaki (are mostly found from Chewani village to Lenda village);
 Ndura (are within Kelokelo village to Maweni and Mazuni village)
 Kinankomba (from Boji and Bububu to Kilindini)
 Gwano (from Wenje village to Baomo and Hara Village)
 Ndera (from Mnazini village to Sera village)

Lower Pokomo (Milanchini)
The LP occupy the entire Tana Delta (which starts at Baomo) to the mouth of the River before it empties into the Indian Ocean; however, currently some UP have settled together with the LP in the villages of Kipini, Ozi, Kilelengwani, Chara, Chamwanamuma, and Kau among other villages up to Lamu Archipelago and its surrounding islands.
 Mwina (live in the villages of Mnguvweni, Gamba, Sera, Mikameni and Mitapani)
 Ngatana (live in the villages of Wema, Hewani, Maziwa, Kulesa, Vumbwe, Sera, Gamba and Garsen)
 Buu (live in Ngao, Tarasaa, Odha, Sailoni, Sera, Golbanti and Idsowe villages)
 Dzunza (mostly found in Kibusu and Shirikisho villages)
 Kalindi (they border the Giriamas in Malindi)

In these sub-tribes, clans range from three to nine in either sub-tribe, and they are mostly found cutting across the eleven sub-tribes. The same clan may have different reference names across sub-tribe. The Zubaki sub-tribe is the largest amongst the Pokomo sub-tribes. It has nine clans: Karhayu, Meta, Jabha, Kinaghasere, Garjedha, Utah, Ilani and Kinakala.

The word "Tana", Tana River, and its origin
The word "Tana" came from early Europeans who brought Christianity. The UP may have known of other rivers, including Chana Maro or River Maro, while the LP referred to the "River Tana" as "Tsana" ("river") as to them this was the only river and others were referred to as Muho or Mukondo - "streams". "Chana" also means "river".

When the first Europeans came to Tana River for the purpose of spreading Christianity, they found it difficult to pronounce the word "Tsana" and found it easier to say "Tana".

Culture
Pokomo culture incorporates rules, rituals, humour and glamour. Pokomo culture was exported to Lamu Archipelago and its surrounding islands, Nkasija and to the Comoro Islands.

The story is told that the name Lamu came from the word Muyamu, which means "in-laws", that is, the Pokomo intermarried with Arabs during the 12th to 13th century. This could be traced in the Lamu Museum, where Pokomo artifacts can be viewed. During this time the Swahili culture was developing. In-breeding between Pokomos and Arabs in Lamu is one possible origin of Swahili people, Swahili culture and the Swahili language (which evolved from Kingozi language) in East Africa as indicated in Nurse and Spears' book The Swahili, Reconstructing the History and Language of an African Society 800–1500. In Bishop Steers' biography (1869) he wrote about Liongo Fumo, whose grave, water well and settlement can all be found in Ozi village.

Strong evidence of Pokomo culture influence was found in Pate Island, where most of the Islamic teachers (Sheikhs) are Pokomos. Probably the name "Comoro" was derived from the Pokomo name "Komora". In fact, the Comoroans and the Pokomo communicate and understand one another as confirmed by Nurse.

The Pokomos are the only tribe in the world with Kingozi language in use today. Kingozi language is the precursor of Swahili as quoted on page 98 in The Periplus of the Erythraean Sea: Travel and Trade in the Indian Ocean. The Pokomo culture is rich in folk tales, songs, dances, weddings, arts/artifacts to name but just a few. In closer comparison, Pokomo culture resembles that of West Africans and they share names with them.

Folklore
Stories were used to affect behaviour. For example, a story that when you whistle during the night, you will encounter a spirit being (seha). This was meant to teach the children not to whistle during the night to avoid disclosing their location to an enemy.

Age groups
Age groups are formed by adolescent men who are circumcised together. Some of these age groups are:
Uhuru or Wembe - circumcised during the time of Kenya getting independence
Mau Mau
Shiti
Pali
Kingishore

Initiation to adulthood
The passage to adulthood for men is by an initiation which involves circumcision – kuhinywa.

Marriage and wedding
The marriage process within the Pokomo community includes specific conditions (Maadha). The man informs his parents, who examine the background of the woman's family. Upon their approval, they visit the bride's family with a perenkera, this is a small vessel for holding tobacco. At the bride's parents house, they give her parents the perenkera as a sign to indicate their son's desire. They introduce the topic to the bride's parents and are told to consult the woman. After she is consulted and has given the green light, the groom's parents come back with hasi (a reed basket) as sign that they are ready to move to the next level. If the bride's family accepts the basket, the groom's parents arrange to come later with jifu. Finally the man's family pays the dowry (mahari), followed by the wedding ceremony. Mahari was paid to the bride's family as a sign of respect.

This tradition has decayed. In most cases, the man and woman typically elope. After staying together for sometime, the woman is released to her parents for further training by her aunts on how to care for her family. Divorces were rare and were discouraged.

Names
Naming in the Pokomo community is based on the husband's family tree. The first born if a boy is given the name of the husband's father and if a girl the name of the husband's mother. Subsequent boys takes the names of the husband's brothers in birth order, while if they are girls, the names of the husband's sisters in birth order. Some names that are taken by both boys and girls, with the prefix Ha before a girl's name. For example, Babwoya (name for a man), Habwoya (name for a lady). Names are taken from plant and animal names if the first born died during pregnancy or delivery in the belief that this will offset the bad omen and thus enable the subsequent children to live to adulthood. Children with such names are referred to as Mwana Fwisa. Such names include Mabuke (banana suckers), Nchui (cheetah) etc. Names also are given to children who are born during a certain season.

Song and dance
The Pokomo have songs and dances, including;
Kingika – a women's dance that is sung whenever a woman gives birth and she is about to come out of the house after finishing the mandatory number of days confined to heal and breastfeed the baby
Miri – performed by young men and women in wedding and birthday ceremonies. During the performance, the young men and women compete to outshine one another. It is complemented with Michirima and Mbumbumbu drums together with a metal plate known as Upatsu and Chivoti flute.
Beni-Mostly performed by the Ngatana subtribe of Wema to welcome distinguished visitors. it's a big drum accompanied by 'utasa' and the only place in to find it is in Wema village
Mwaribe – danced by young girls to the beat of a drum during circumcision time. The traditional costume is grass skirt made from the fronds of the Doum Palm (Mkoma leaves) worn especially by boys. 
Kitoko- performed by everyone during weddings, birth and any joyful celebrations.
Mela ya Walume (men songs)
Mela ya Kitoko – songs that are sung while working in the fields or paddling a canoe in the evenings. These songs resemble the "sundowner songs" that were traditionally sung when the canoe was full with cargo ( bananas, mangoes etc.) sailing downstream with little effort from the oar.
Other songs known as Dulila were sung to correct the behaviour of an individual by shaming him/her over disgracing the community (Kudabha). These songs were mainly sung by women in a group and they approach the person who has erred (Kadabha) and start to pinch him/her.
The Kenya national anthem is an African song whose tune was borrowed from the Pokomo community lullaby. This traditional lullaby lyrics are: . Roughly translated, this means, "you animal, you animal, our child is crying, please come and eat it so that it can stop crying." The song was composed by Mzee Menza Morowa Galana of Makere village, Gwano in Wenje division. The composer (Mzee Menza) died on 12 November 2015 at age 96. Pokomo people use music to blend their culture in celebrating harvest, fishing, hunting, wedding, circumcision and when new babies were born.

Festivals
Pokomo have only two seasons in namely, Sika and Kilimo. They were able to tell by looking into the sky and the moon whether the coming rains are for Mvula ya Masika - short rains, which meant that the community would plant fast-maturing crops or Mvula ya Kilimo – long rains, which meant that the community would plant long-maturing crops and those that require a lot of water to mature, such as rice.

Land tenure
Pokomo land stretches from Mbalambala to Kipini along the River Tana on both sides. Largely, the Tana River County land belongs to the Pokomo. Land was earlier distributed by the Kijo and Gasa Council of elders to each sub-tribe as indicated in the names of the villages they live in. Three types of land tenure systems are practiced among the Pokomo. These are:

(a) Mafumbo - in each clan each family was given land from one side of the river flooding zone to the other side of the river flooding zone across. This was meant to avoid conflicts when the river changes its course;

(b) Mihema ya Walume - these are virgin lands that do not belong to anybody, but are used by those who develop it. A family is shown an area to farm, but must clear the forests within a certain time or lose it to another.

(c) Bada - (loosely translated as "forest"), were preserved for medicinal plants, firewood and to provide building materials.

Cuisine

The Pokomo eat Tana river catfish (mtonzi, or, if it is the largest, it is called mpumi), tilapia (ntuku), trout (ningu), eel (mamba) and crocodile (ngwena). Catfish are mainly boiled or sun dried/smoked. Other food sources include plantains, palm tree seeds, bananas, peas and pumpkins.

Pokomos depend on the flooding regime of the Tana to grow rice, bananas, green grams, beans and maize. The staple foods are rice and fish. Sima (stiff cornmeal porridge) has become the staple Pokomo dish due to the changing or absence of river flooding regimes and weather that is not able to support rice cultivation.

Governance and spiritual life

The government was led by a council of elders referred to as kijo. The three arms below the kijo are: (a) judicial system referred to as Gasa; (b) the secretaries (executive assistants) referred to as the Wagangana and (c) the Pokomo religious arm of the Kijo.

Kijo
Kijo was a Council of Elders who were very powerful. They had absolute power to excommunicate, imprison and execute those who had been found guilty by the Gasa. Execution was by tying a heavy stone around the neck of the individual and throwing him/her into the River Tana.

At times during the year people would gather near the sacred places (Ngaji) in the night singing and dancing and the Kijo leader would emerge from the sacred forest in the middle of the night walking on poles covered with a white dress and his face covered with a mask. He walked around and danced to the sound of beating drums and returned to the forest, leaving behind a hysterical crowd of people believing that their issues had been solved spiritually. The main sacred places were Mji wa Walevu (Elders village), Nkozi and Laini Keya located near Kone village.

Nkozi, the mother village of Kitere was located in the flood plains of River Tana. It was the centre of the Kijo. Before someone becomes a Mkijo he undergoes an activity known as Kuyumia Ngaji that was only done at Nkozi. Nkozi flooded twice a year, leading locals to move elsewhere. During flood seasons, people erected structures above the water level, which are known in the Pokomo community as Mahandaki. The people would live on top of these structures. In 1946 the floods were unusually high and residents were marooned for days; these floods were named Seli ya Nkozi, loosely translated to mean the Nkozi jail cell; the floods covered areas that the yearly floods did not. It was said that haunting spirits (Maseha) lived at Kitere village.

Others said that ancestors of Nkozi people could be heard talking at Kitere village and that these haunting spirits would sing and dance Miri (a Pokomo dance) and could be heard singing, dancing and playing with a famous song at Ndera -  People from Mnazini village south of Nkozi would travel northwards in the direction of Nkozi where the singing was heard from the other side, and those from Nkozi would heading south toward Mnazini village. They would eventually meet on the way, wondering where the singing and dancing was really coming from; They singers were said to be Maseha (evil spirit beings).

This made it difficult for anybody to dare to settle and live at Kitere village. However, after 1946 floods Nkozi and its surroundings were covered with water the community fled Nkozi in canoes and moved to Kitere village. Before settling at Kitere village religious cleansing rituals were conducted to drive away the haunting spirits.

Gasa
The judicial arm of the Kijo is still headed by the Gasa. This is another Council of Elders who showed wisdom and reputable behavior. They are revered and trusted to administer justice. The Gasa is the only elder group still in existence and also gives political guidance. The Gasa has been formally recognised to dispense justice on land and family matters. There are two bodies in the Pokomo community, one for UP and the other for LP. The two combine to form a unified Gasa.

Wagangana
This is composed of a group of elders who are sent by the Kijo to deliver a message or to call somebody who is needed by the Kijo. For example, whenever the Kijo is meeting, they can send the Wagangana to collect food from community members; or whenever a punishment or an order is given by the Kijo, the Wagangana ensure it is implemented.

Pokomo religion: third arm of Kijo

Mulungu (UP) or Mungu (LP) is the universal being of the Pokomo, referring to God the creator of everything. He is believed to bring upon the community abundance and scarcity. The Pokomos traditionally had one religion, guided by a group of spiritual elders among the kijo. Kijo members would seek guidance at sacred prayer areas in the riverine forests.

Due to increased population growth and the introduction of Christianity and Islam, these sacred places were converted to farmlands. The majority living in Hola Mission are Christians and those in Laza centre are Muslims.

Notable people
Phares Kuindwa – former head of civil service
Yuda Komora – former Assistant Minister for Education and MP for Garsen
Japhet Zacharia Kase – former Assistant Minister and MP for Galole
Israel Lekwa Ddaiddo – former MP for Garsen
Danson Mungatana – former MP for Garsen
Rtd Maj.Dr. Godhana Dhadho Gaddae – former MP for Galole and now Second Governor to the Tana River County. 
Wilson Hiribae – former permanent secretary ministry of economic planning.
Nathan Oddo Hiribae – former District Commissioner and Deputy Speaker and Ward Rep for Tana County and Kinakomba Ward

Notes

References

 
 

 Reviewed by Marguerite Ylvisaker, The International Journal of African Historical Studies Vol. 15. No. 4 pp. 707–709,
 Reviewed by Said A. M. Khamis, Research in African Literature Vol. 23. No. 3 pp. 128–129

External links
Literacy and translation work among the Lower Pokomo
Ethnologue and bibliography information on Pokomo
People-in-country profile

Ethnic groups in Kenya
Mijikenda
Tana River (Kenya)
Tana River County